Laurin Hendrix is a Republican member of the Arizona House of Representatives, representing the 14th legislative district since 2023. He previously served in the Arizona House of Representatives from 2009 through 2011. He ran for re-election in 2012, but was defeated in the Republican primary by Eddie Farnsworth and Steve R. Urie. He again ran in 2022, and was elected alongside Speaker pro tempore Travis Grantham.

References

Republican Party members of the Arizona House of Representatives
Women state legislators in Arizona
21st-century American politicians
21st-century American women politicians
Year of birth missing (living people)
Living people